Ian Martin Sloan (born 19 November 1993) is an Irish field hockey player, who plays as a midfielder for Wimbledon and the England and Great Britain national teams.

He represented Great Britain at the 2016 Summer Olympics. Sloan was a member of the England teams that won the bronze medals at the 2018 Commonwealth Games and at the 2017 Men's EuroHockey Nations Championship. He also represented England at the 2018 Men's Hockey World Cup.

Early years, family and education
Sloan is the youngest son of Martin and Adele Sloan. Martin Sloan is a former Ireland captain and Great Britain field hockey international. Adele Sloan is a former Ireland women's field hockey international and between 2007 and 2013 was the head teacher at Cookstown High School. Sloan's brother, Stephen, is also a field hockey player and has played for Cookstown. Sloan was educated at Cookstown High School and Loughborough University.

Club career

Cookstown High School
Between 2007 and 2009 Sloan was a member of the Cookstown High School team that won the All Ireland Schoolboys Hockey Championship and two successive Burney Cup/McCullough Cup doubles. Among his teammates were his brother Stephen and fellow future Ireland, England and Great Britain international, David Ames. In 2007 Sloan scored in the All Ireland final as Cookstown High defeated Banbridge Academy 4–2. In 2007–08 Cookstown High and Sloan won the McCullough Cup, again defeating Banbridge Academy in the final. In the 2007–08 Burney Cup final Cookstown High and Sloan defeated the Royal and Prior School of Raphoe 6–3 after extra time. In the 2008–09 McCullough Cup final Sloan scored as Cookstown High defeated Sullivan Upper School 3–0 in the final. In the 2008–09 Burney Cup final Sloan scored a hat-trick as Cookstown High defeated Banbridge Academy 4–3 in the final.

Cookstown
During his early Cookstown career, Sloan played in the seconds with his brother, Stephen, and his father Martin. In 2010–11 Sloan was a member of the Cookstown team that won the Irish Senior Cup. Sloan scored twice in a 4–3 win against Monkstown. He was subsequently named player of the match.
Sloan also played for Cookstown in the Men's Irish Hockey League and the 2011–12 Euro Hockey League.

Loughborough Students
While attending Loughborough University and studying for a degree in Accounting and Financial Management, Sloan also played for Loughborough Students in the Men's English Hockey League. He also played for Loughborough at intervarsity level and coached the university's second team in the Midlands League.

Wimbledon
In 2014 Sloan switched clubs from relegated Loughborough Students to Wimbledon. He subsequently helped Wimbledon win four successive Men's English Hockey League titles in 2014–15, 2015–16, 2016–17 and 2017–18. He has represented Wimbledon in the 2016–17, 2017–18, and 2018–19 Euro Hockey Leagues.

International career

Ireland
Sloan captained the Ireland Under-18 team at the 2011 EuroHockey U18 Championship. He was the topscorer in the tournament, scoring seven of Ireland's 10 goals.  
Between 2011 and 2012, Sloan made 21 senior international appearances for Ireland. In June 2011 he made his senior debut for Ireland against China. He subsequently represented Ireland at the 2011 Men's EuroHockey Nations Championship and at a 2012 Men's Field Hockey Olympic Qualifier. In April 2012 Sloan made his last appearance for Ireland in a 2–1 away win against Germany. Sloan and David Ames both scored for Ireland. In January 2013 Sloan and Ames announced that they were switching allegiances from Ireland to England/Great Britain.

Great Britain
Having previously played for Ireland, Sloan had to wait for three years before he was eligible to play for Great Britain. He eventually made his debut for Great Britain in April 2015 in a 3–2 win against Germany in an unofficial international. He made his official debut for Great Britain on 14 May 2015, in a 1–1 draw against Argentina. He subsequently represented Great Britain at the 2016 Summer Olympics. Sloan captained Great Britain when they won the 2017 Sultan Azlan Shah Cup. In May 2017, together with George Pinner and Phil Roper, Sloan was named as one of three captains of England/Great Britain.

England
Sloan has represented England at the 2017 Men's EuroHockey Nations Championship, the 2018 Commonwealth Games and the 2018 Men's Hockey World Cup.

Field hockey coach
Sloan has coached Loughborough Students second team in the Midlands League and Wycombe in the South League.

Honours
Great Britain
Sultan Azlan Shah Cup
Winners: 2017
England
Sultan Azlan Shah Cup
Runners up: 2018
Ireland
Men's Field Hockey Olympic Qualifier
Runners up: 2012
Wimbledon
Men's English Hockey League
Winners: 2014–15, 2015–16, 2016–17, 2017–18: 4
Cookstown
Irish Senior Cup
Winners: 2011: 2
Cookstown High School
All Ireland Schoolboys Hockey Championship
Winners: 2007: 1
Burney Cup
Winners: 2007–08, 2008–09: 2
McCullough Cup
Winners: 2007–08, 2008–09: 2

References

External links
 
 
 

1993 births
Living people
British male field hockey players
Male field hockey players from Northern Ireland
Irish male field hockey players
English male field hockey players
Male field hockey midfielders
Male field hockey forwards
Field hockey players at the 2016 Summer Olympics
Field hockey players at the 2020 Summer Olympics
Olympic field hockey players of Great Britain
Field hockey players at the 2018 Commonwealth Games
2018 Men's Hockey World Cup players
Commonwealth Games medallists in field hockey
Commonwealth Games bronze medallists for England
Wimbledon Hockey Club players
Loughborough Students field hockey players
Men's Irish Hockey League players
Sportspeople from County Tyrone
People educated at Cookstown High School
Alumni of Loughborough University
Irish field hockey coaches
English field hockey coaches
Men's England Hockey League players
Ireland international men's field hockey players
Medallists at the 2018 Commonwealth Games